Ruxandra Dragomir Ilie and Nadia Petrova were the defending champions, but did not compete this year.

Catherine Barclay and Martina Müller won the title, defeating Bianka Lamade and Magdalena Maleeva 6–4, 7–5 in the final.

Seeds

Draw

Draw

External links
 Main Draw (WTA)

Women's Doubles
Doubles